No. 614 Squadron was originally formed on 1 June 1937 as an army co-operation squadron unit of the Auxiliary Air Force. It served during the Second World War first in this role and later as a bomber squadron. Upon reformation it served as a fighter squadron until the disbandment of the Royal Auxiliary Air Force on 10 March 1957.

History

Formation and early years
Formed at RAF Pengam Moors near Cardiff (the often cited Llandow was not erected yet) as an army co-operation squadron unit and part of the Auxiliary Air Force on 1 June 1937, No. 614 squadron was initially equipped with Hawker Hinds. By the end of the year it had received some additional Hawker Hectors which it flew until November 1939, when the squadron became operational on Westland Lysanders, the first of which had arrived in July of that year.

In support of Bomber Command
In June 1940 No. 614 squadron moved to Scotland to carry out coastal patrols, covering an area from Inverness to Berwick, 'A' flight, which was detached to Inverness for that purpose, became No. 241 Squadron RAF in the process. 
From July 1941 it began re-equipping with Bristol Blenheims, a process completed by January 1942. In support of RAF Bomber Command's 'Thousand Bomber Raids' in May and June 1942, the squadron sent its Blenheims to attack enemy airfields in the Low Countries and in August 1942 it laid smoke screens for the landings at Dieppe.

In North Africa
In November 1942 the Squadron moved to North Africa. There the Squadron carried out attacks against enemy airfields and lines of communication until May 1943, when the fighting in that area ended. It then became involved in shipping escort duties in the Mediterranean until being disbanded on 25 January 1944 at Borizzo Airfield, Sicily.

On Halifaxes and Liberators
The second incarnation of No. 614 Squadron had its origins in No. 462 Squadron, Royal Australian Air Force (RAAF), formed on 7 September 1942 at Fayid, Egypt, under Article XV of the British Commonwealth Air Training Plan. This squadron contained mostly British aircrew and ground staff. Consequently, RAAF Overseas Headquarters requested that the squadron be renumbered and transferred to the RAF. On 15 February 1944, while it was en route to Celone, Italy the unit was renumbered as No. 614 Squadron. Equipped with Handley Page Halifaxes it was now involved in bombing missions over Italy and the Balkans and it also carried out supply drops to partisans in those areas. The Squadron re-equipped with Consolidated Liberators in March 1945, the Halifaxes finally being withdrawn in March 1945, but on 27 July 1945 it was disbanded at Amendola Airfield, Italy when it was renumbered as No. 214 Squadron RAF.

Post war
With the reactivation of the Royal Auxiliary Air Force, No. 614 Squadron was reformed on 10 May 1946 (though one source claims 26 August 1947) at RAF Llandow as a day fighter squadron. Recruiting of personnel did not start until November 1946 though. Initially the squadron was equipped with Supermarine Spitfires and these gave way to de Havilland Vampires in July 1950 but, along with all the flying units of the RAuxAF, the unit was disbanded on 10 March 1957.

Present
Currently 614 Squadron is part of the Royal Air Force Reserves, based in Cardiff, Wales.

Aircraft operated

Squadron bases

Commanding officers

References

Notes

Bibliography

 

 
  (reprinted 2007).

External links

 614 sqn on RAF website
 No. 614 "County of Glamorgan" Squadron (RAF): Second World War
 No 611-620 Squadron Histories on RAFWeb
 No. 614 sqn’s Blenheims in East Lothian
 Current page on RAF Reserves website

614
Military units and formations established in 1937
Military units and formations disestablished in 1957